Jean-Louis Richard Robinson (born 22 March 1952) is a Malagasy politician. Robinson was the top contender in the first round of the 2013 general election held in September 2013. He lost the run-off against Hery Rajaonarimampianina in the second round of presidential elections held in December 2013, earning 46.5% of the vote against 53.5% for Rajaonarimampianina. Robinson served in the government of Madagascar as Minister of Health under President Marc Ravalomanana, and he was the Ravalomanana camp's candidate in the 2013 election.

References

1952 births
Living people
Government ministers of Madagascar
Malagasy physicians